The Armed Forces of the Philippines Joint Special Operations Group (abbrv. as JSOG or AFP-JSOG) was one of the AFP's Wide Support Units tasked in conducting counter-terrorism, unconventional-guerrilla warfare, asymmetrical warfare, and highly specialized operations that no other regular AFP unit can handle. In April 2018, the AFP Joint Special Operations Group was deactivated and its officers and enlisted personnel were transferred to form the core of the new AFP Special Operations Command, (AFPSOCOM).

Line Units
 Headquarters & Headquarters Company
 Group Service Company
 Joint Special Operations Unit 1
 Joint Special Operations Unit 2
 Joint Special Operations Unit 3
 Joint Readiness Training Department
 Technical Aerial Reconnaissance Unit
OPCON Units:
 Light Reaction Regiment "Tiradores de la Muerte"
 Light Reaction Company 1 "Eximus Peratus"
 Light Reaction Company 2 "Nasiglat"
 Light Reaction Company 3 "Way Kurat"
 Light Reaction Company 4 "Perdigones"
 Light Reaction Company 5 "Mandaragit"
 Light Reaction Company 6 "Dares Against Odds"
 Naval Special Operations Group 8, PN
 Marine Special Operations Group
 710th Special Operations Wing, PAF "Trained Hard, Fight to Win"
 Special Operations Tactical Airlift Flight
 Special Operations Tactical Helicopter Flight
 13th EOD Team, 1EODP, 1EODC,EODB, PA
 K-9 Platoon

Lineage of Commanding Officers
 Col. Jose B. Vizcarra INF (GSC) PA
 Col. Eduardo D. Del Rosario INF (GSC) PA
 Col. Ramon Mateo U. Dizon INF (GSC) PA
 Col. Danilo G. Pamonag INF (GSC) PA
 Col. Teodoro A. Llamas INF (GSC) PA
 Col. Corleto S. Vinluan Jr. INF (GSC) PA

Operations
 Hostage Rescue Operations
 Direct Actions (Hasty & Deliberate Attack, Ambush, Target Interdiction)
 Anti-guerrilla operations against the New People's Army
 Counter-terrorist Operations against known Terrorist Groups.
 Anti-terrorist operations against known terror groups operating in their AOR.
 Intelligence and Counter-Intelligence Operations against government destabilizers.
 Disaster Relief, Rescue and Rehabilitation Operations.
 September 2013: JSOG is the lead counter terrorist unit which assaulted MNLF strongholds during the Zamboanga Siege

References

Bibliography

 General Orders Nr 959, GHQ AFP dtd 13 August 2003
 Proposed AFP-Joint Special Operations Handbook, AFP Doctrine Center, Quezon City

Joint military units and formations of the Philippines
Special forces of the Philippines
Military units and formations established in 2003